Tešić is a Serbian surname. It may refer to:

Igor Tešić (born 1988), Serbian beach volleyball player
Saša Tešić (born 1969), Serbian footballer
Steve Tesich (1942–1996), Serbian-American screenwriter

See also
Tešović, surname

Serbian surnames